The 14 cm Minenwerfer M 15 was a medium mortar used by Austria-Hungary in World War I. It was developed by Škoda Works as an alternative to a German design from Rheinische Metallwarenfabrik/Ehrhardt for which ammunition could not be procured. It was a rigid-recoil, rifled, muzzle-loading weapon that had to be levered around to aim at new targets. It was lifted onto a two-wheel cart for transport.

The M 16 version added a central barrel ring and cutouts on the side of the carriage. Rotation within the barrel was improved, greatly increasing accuracy. Its transport cart was also improved.

The first batch of 100 mortars was ordered in May 1915 and a second batch in spring 1916, but deliveries were slow; only 88 of the second batch could be sent to the front by May 1916. A third batch of 300 was ordered in November 1916, but production was such that only 30 had been delivered by the spring of 1917.

References
 Ortner, M. Christian. The Austro-Hungarian Artillery From 1867 to 1918: Technology, Organization, and Tactics. Vienna, Verlag Militaria, 2007 

Mortars of Austria-Hungary
140 mm artillery